The 1988 Victorian Football League (VFL) season was the ninety second season of the VFL. The season saw 90 Australian rules footballers make their senior VFL debut and 30 players transferring to new clubs having previously played in the VFL.

Summary

Debuts

References

Australian rules football records and statistics
Australian rules football-related lists
1988 in Australian rules football